The Wicker Man is a 1973 British folk horror film directed by Robin Hardy and starring Edward Woodward, Britt Ekland, Diane Cilento, Ingrid Pitt, and Christopher Lee. The screenplay by Anthony Shaffer, inspired by David Pinner's 1967 novel Ritual, centres on the visit of Police Sergeant Neil Howie to the isolated Scottish island of Summerisle in search of a missing girl. Howie, a devout Christian, is appalled to find that the inhabitants of the island have abandoned Christianity and now practise a form of Celtic paganism. Paul Giovanni composed the film score.

The Wicker Man is well-regarded by critics. Film magazine Cinefantastique described it as "The Citizen Kane of horror movies", and in 2004, Total Film magazine named The Wicker Man the sixth-greatest British film of all time. It also won the 1978 Saturn Award for Best Horror Film. The final scene was number 45 on Bravo's 100 Scariest Movie Moments, and during the 2012 Summer Olympics opening ceremony, it was included as part of a sequence that celebrated British cinema. The film brought the wicker man into modern popular culture.

In 1989, Shaffer wrote a script treatment for The Loathsome Lambton Worm, a direct sequel with fantasy elements. Hardy had no interest in the project, and it was never produced. In 2006, a poorly received American remake was released, from which Hardy and others involved with the original have dissociated themselves. In 2011, a spiritual sequel directed by Hardy, The Wicker Tree, was released; it featured Lee in a cameo appearance. In 2013, the original U.S. theatrical version of The Wicker Man was digitally restored and released.

Plot
Police Sergeant Neil Howie journeys by seaplane to the remote Hebridean island of Summerisle to investigate the disappearance of a young girl, Rowan Morrison, about whom he has received an anonymous letter. Howie, a devout Christian, is disturbed to find the Islanders paying homage to the pagan Celtic gods of their ancestors. They copulate openly in the fields, include children as part of the May Day celebrations, teach children of the phallic association of the maypole, and place toads in their mouths to cure sore throats. The islanders appear to be trying to thwart his investigation by claiming that Rowan never existed.

While staying at the Green Man Inn, Howie notices a series of photographs celebrating the annual harvest, each featuring a young girl as the May Queen. The photograph of the most recent celebration is missing; the landlord tells him it was broken. At the local school, Howie asks the students about Rowan, but all deny her existence. He checks the school register and finds Rowan's name. He questions the schoolteacher, who directs him to Rowan's grave.

Howie meets the island's leader, Lord Summerisle, grandson of a Victorian agronomist, to get permission for an exhumation. Summerisle explains that his grandfather developed strains of fruit trees that would prosper in Scotland's climate and encouraged the belief that the old gods would use the new strains to bring prosperity to the island among the pagan population. Due to the bountiful harvests, the island's other inhabitants gradually embraced paganism.

Exhuming the grave, Howie finds that the coffin contains only the carcass of a hare. He also finds the missing harvest photograph, showing Rowan standing amidst empty boxes; the harvest had failed. His research reveals that a human sacrifice is offered to the gods in the event of crop failure. He concludes that Rowan is alive and will soon be sacrificed to ensure a successful harvest. Seeking assistance from the mainland, Howie returns to his seaplane to discover it no longer functions and its radio is damaged; he cannot leave or call for help. Later that day during the May Day celebration, Howie subdues the innkeeper and steals his costume and mask (that of Punch, the fool) to infiltrate the parade. Rowan is eventually revealed. Howie sets her free and flees with her into a cave. Exiting it, they are intercepted by the islanders, to whom Rowan happily returns.

Summerisle tells Howie that Rowan was never the intended sacrifice; Howie is. He fits their gods' four requirements – he came of his own free will, has "the power of a king" (by representing the law), is a virgin, and is a "fool". Howie warns Summerisle and the islanders that the crops are failing due to the unsuitability of the climate and that the villagers will turn on Summerisle and sacrifice him next summer when the next harvest fails again, but his pleas are ignored. The villagers force Howie inside a giant wicker man statue along with various animals, set it ablaze, and surround it, singing the Middle English folk song "Sumer Is Icumen In". Inside the wicker man, Howie recites Psalm 23, prays to God and curses the islanders. The animals and he burn to death and the head of the wicker man collapses in flames, revealing the setting sun.

Cast

 Edward Woodward as Sgt. Neil Howie
 Christopher Lee as Lord Summerisle
 Britt Ekland as Willow MacGregor
 Annie Ross as Willow MacGregor (voice)
 Rachel Verney as Willow MacGregor (singing voice)
 Lesley Mackie as Daisy
 Diane Cilento as Miss Rose
 Ingrid Pitt as Librarian
 Lindsay Kemp as Alder MacGregor (the landlord)
 Russell Waters as Harbour Master
 Aubrey Morris as Old Gardener/Gravedigger
 Irene Sunter as May Morrison
 Jennifer Martin as Myrtle Morrison
 Donald Eccles as T.H. Lennox
 Walter Carr as Schoolmaster
 Roy Boyd as Broome
 Peter Brewis as Musician
 Geraldine Cowper as Rowan Morrison
 John Young as Fishmonger
 Myra Forsyth as Mrs Grimmond
 Alison Hughes as Sgt Howie's fiancé
 Barbara Rafferty as woman with baby
 John Sharp as Doctor Ewan (longer version)
 John Hallam as Police Constable McTaggart (longer version)
 Tony Roper as Postman (longer version)

Production

Background

In the early 1970s, Christopher Lee was a Hammer Horror regular, best known for his roles in a series of successful films, beginning with The Curse of Frankenstein (as the monster, 1957). Lee wanted to break free of this image and take on more interesting acting roles. The idea for The Wicker Man film began in 1971 when Lee met with screenwriter Anthony Shaffer, and they agreed to work together. Film director Robin Hardy and British Lion head Peter Snell became involved in the project. Shaffer had a series of conversations with Hardy, and the two decided that making a horror film centering on "old religion" would be fun, in sharp contrast to the Hammer films they had both seen as horror-film fans.

Shaffer read the David Pinner novel Ritual, in which a devout Christian policeman is called to investigate what appears to be the ritual murder of a young girl in a rural village, and decided that it would serve well as the source material for the project. Pinner originally wrote Ritual as a film treatment for director Michael Winner, who had John Hurt in mind as a possible star. Winner eventually declined the project, so Pinner's agent persuaded him to write Ritual as a novel instead. Shaffer and Lee paid Pinner £15,000 for the rights to the novel, and Shaffer set to work on the screenplay. He soon decided that a direct adaptation would not work well, so drafted a new story based only loosely on the story of the novel.

Shaffer wanted the film to be "a little more literate" than the average horror picture. He specifically wanted a film with a minimum of violence and gore. He was tired of seeing horror films that relied almost entirely on viscera to be scary. The focus of the film was crystallised when he "finally hit upon the abstract concept of sacrifice." The image of the wicker man, which gave the filmmakers their title, was taken from the description of the practice of human sacrifice by the Gauls in Julius Caesar's Commentaries on the Gallic War: "Others have figures of vast size, the limbs of which formed of osiers they fill with living men, which being set on fire, the men perish enveloped in the flames." For Shaffer, this was "the most alarming and imposing image that I had ever seen." The idea of a confrontation between a modern Christian and a remote, pagan community continued to intrigue Shaffer, who performed painstaking research on paganism. Brainstorming with Hardy, they conceived the film as presenting the pagan elements objectively and accurately, accompanied by authentic music and a believable, contemporary setting. One of their main resources was The Golden Bough, a study of mythology and religion written by Scottish anthropologist James Frazer.

Casting
Television actor Edward Woodward was cast in the role of Sergeant Neil Howie after the part was declined by both Michael York and David Hemmings. In Britain, Woodward was best known for the role of Callan, which he played from 1967 to 1972. After The Wicker Man, Woodward went on to receive international attention for his roles in the 1980 film Breaker Morant and the 1980s TV series The Equalizer.

After Shaffer saw her on the stage, he lured Diane Cilento out of semiretirement to play the town's schoolmistress. (They lived together in Queensland from 1975, and married in 1985). Ingrid Pitt, another British horror film veteran, was cast as the town librarian and registrar.  Swedish actress Britt Ekland was cast as the innkeeper's lascivious daughter, although two body doubles were used for her naked scenes below the waist. Ekland found out that she was three-months pregnant with her son Nic, to Lou Adler two weeks into filming. Stuart Hopps (the film's choreographer) called upon Lorraine Peters, a nightclub dancer from Glasgow, who gyrated at the doorway and against the wall of a bedroom in the fully nude "wall" scenes. Her speaking and singing voices were dubbed by Annie Ross and Rachel Verney, respectively.

Local girl Jane Jackson was employed as Ekland's stand-in for camera setups. Jackson was blonde-haired and bore a resemblance to Britt Ekland, but was otherwise not involved in any filming.

Filming 

The film was produced at a time of crisis for the British film industry. The studio in charge of production, British Lion Films, was in financial trouble and was bought by wealthy businessman John Bentley. To convince the unions that he was not about to asset-strip the company, Bentley needed to get a film into production quickly. This meant that The Wicker Man, a film set during spring, actually began filming in October 1972; artificial leaves and blossoms had to be glued to trees in many scenes. The production was kept on a small budget. Christopher Lee was extremely keen to get the film made; he and others worked on the production without pay. While filming took place, British Lion was bought by EMI Films.

The film was shot almost entirely in the small Scottish towns of Stranraer, Gatehouse of Fleet, Newton Stewart, Kirkcudbright, Anwoth and Creetown in Galloway, as well as Plockton in Ross-shire. Some scenes were filmed in and around the Isle of Whithorn, where the owners of the castle, Elizabeth McAdam McLaughland and David Wheatley, plus several other local people, featured in various scenes. Culzean Castle in Ayrshire and its grounds and Floors Castle in Roxburghshire were also used for the shooting. Some of the opening flying shots feature the Isle of Skye, including the pinnacles of The Storr and the Quiraing. The interior cave scenes were filmed inside Wookey Hole in Somerset. The amphibious aircraft that carries Sergeant Howie was a Thurston Teal, owned and flown in the aerial sequences by Christopher Murphy. The climax of the film was shot at St Ninian's Cave and on the clifftops at Burrow Head in Wigtownshire. According to Britt Ekland, some animals perished in the wicker man, whereas Robin Hardy said in an interview that great care was taken to ensure that the animals were in no danger of being hurt during this scene, and that they were not inside the wicker man when it was set on fire.

Hush Heath Estate in Staplehurst, Kent, makes a brief appearance in the film, doubling as Lord Summerisle's orchard and gardens.

Music

The film's soundtrack often forms a major component of the narrative, just as with other important arthouse films of the era such as Donald Cammell and Nicolas Roeg's Performance. Songs accompany many important scenes, such as the plane's arrival, Willow's dancing, the maypole dance, the girls jumping through fire, the search of the houses, the procession, and the final burning scene. Indeed, according to Seamus Flannery in a subsequent documentary, director Robin Hardy surprised the cast by suddenly announcing midway through filming that they were making a "musical".

Composed, arranged, and recorded by Paul Giovanni, and performed by Magnet (in some versions of the film credited as "Lodestone"), the soundtrack contains 13 folk songs performed by characters in the film. Included are traditional songs, original compositions by Giovanni, and even a nursery rhyme, "Baa, Baa, Black Sheep".

"Willow's Song" has been covered or sampled by various rock music bands. It was first covered by an English musical project known as Nature and Organisation on their 1994 release Beauty Reaps the Blood of Solitude. It was covered by Sneaker Pimps as "How Do", and is included on their 1996 release Becoming X. "How Do" can be heard in the movie Hostel (2005); the song is incorrectly credited in the end titles as being composed by Sneaker Pimps. Additionally, the band has covered "Gently Johnny" as "Johnny"; it is featured as a B-side on their single "Roll On" (1996). It also was covered by Faith and the Muse on their 2003 album The Burning Season, and The Mock Turtles on their album Turtle Soup.

The songs on the soundtrack were composed or arranged by Giovanni under the direction of Hardy and Shaffer, whose research into the oral folk tradition in England and Scotland was based largely on the work of Cecil Sharp, a "founding father" of the folk-revival movement of the early 20th century. Using Sharp's collections as a template, Shaffer noted to Giovanni which scenes were to have music, and in some cases provided lyrics, which would be appropriate to spring pagan festivals. Other songs on the soundtrack come from a later folk tradition; for example, "Corn Riggs", by Scotland's national bard, Robert Burns, accompanies Howie's arrival on Summerisle. The lyrics of this song were taken directly from the Burns song "The Rigs of Barley", but Giovanni used a very different tune. Burns' tune was based on "Corn Riggs", and altered to match his lyrics. The song sung by the cultists of Summerisle at the end of the film, "Sumer Is Icumen In", is a mid-13th-century song about nature in spring.

The Wickerman Festival was an annual music festival held near Auchencairn in Galloway.  Dubbed "Scotland's Alternative Music festival", it began in 2001 when the festival's artistic director Sid Ambrose hit upon the idea of a local counterculture based family-friendly festival due to the surrounding area being inextricably linked with various locations used within The Wicker Man. It was held annually until 2015 at East Kirkcarswell Farm, Dundrennan.

Distribution

By the time of the film's completion, the studio had been bought by EMI, and British Lion was managed by Michael Deeley. The DVD commentary track states that studio executives suggested a more "upbeat" ending to the film, in which a sudden rain puts the flames of the wicker man out and spares Howie's life, but this suggestion was refused. Hardy subsequently had to remove about 20 minutes of scenes on the mainland, early investigations, and (to Lee's disappointment) some of Lord Summerisle's initial meeting with Howie.

Original release
The first screening of the film was to trade and cinema distributors on 3 December 1973. The first public theatrical release was a week of test screenings at the Metropole Cinema London on 6 December 1973 ahead of the official public release in January 1974. It runs 87 minutes.

A copy of a finished, 99-minute version was sent to American film producer Roger Corman in Hollywood to make a judgment of how to market the film in the US. Corman recommended an additional 13 minutes be cut from the film. (Corman did not acquire US release rights, and eventually Warner Bros. test-marketed the film in drive-ins.) In Britain, the film was ordered reduced to roughly 87 minutes, with some narrative restructuring, and released as the "B" picture on a double bill with Don't Look Now. According to Lee, the cuts adversely affected the film's continuity.

First restoration
During the mid-1970s, Hardy made inquiries about the film, hoping to restore it to his original vision. Along with Lee and Shaffer, Hardy searched for his original cut, or raw footage. Both of these appeared to have been lost. Director Alex Cox said in his Moviedrome introduction in 1988 that the negative had "ended up in the pylons that support the M4 motorway." Hardy recalled that a copy of the film made prior to Deeley's cuts was sent to Corman, who, it turned out, still had a copy, possibly the only existing print of Hardy's original cut. The US rights had been sold by Warner Bros. to a small firm called Abraxas, managed by film buff Stirling Smith and critic John Alan Simon. Stirling agreed to an American release of a reconstruction by Hardy. Hardy restored the narrative structure, some of the erotic elements which had been excised, and a very brief pretitle segment of Howie on the mainland (appearing at a church with his fiancée). A 96-minute restored version was released in January 1979, again to critical acclaim.

US VHS versions
The original 99-minute version was available in the US on VHS home video from Media Home Entertainment (and later Magnum) during the 1980s and 1990s. This video includes additional early scenes set inside Howie's police station, which Hardy had left out of the 1979 restoration. In 2001, a remaster of the 88-minute cut was released on VHS, labeled as the "Theatrical Version".

Director's cut
In 2001, the film's new world rights owners, Canal+, tried to release the full-length film. Corman's copy had been lost, but a telecine transfer to 1-inch videotape existed. Missing elements were combined with film elements from the previous versions (in particular, additional scenes of Howie on the mainland were restored, showing him to be the object of gossip at his police station, establishing his devout religiosity). The extended DVD cut was released by Canal+ (Anchor Bay Entertainment handling US DVD distribution) in this 99-minute hybrid, considered the longest and closest version to Hardy's original 100-odd minute version. A two-disc limited edition set was sold with the shortened theatrical release, the new extended version and a documentary, The Wicker Man Enigma. In 2005, Inside The Wicker Man author Allan Brown revealed he had discovered stills taken on the set showing sequences from the script that had never been seen; it had never been certain that the scenes had been filmed. They include scenes where Howie closes a mainland pub open after hours, encounters a prostitute, has a massage from Willow McGregor, and sees a brutal confrontation between Oak and a villager in The Green Man, which were featured in a revised edition of Inside the Wicker Man. Anchor Bay released a limited-edition wooden box of The Wicker Man. About 50,000 two-disc sets were made, of which 20 were signed by Lee and Woodward, Shaffer, Snell, and Hardy. In March 2002, Lee discussed the lost original cut, "I still believe it exists somewhere, in cans with no name. I still believe that. But nobody's ever seen it since, so we couldn't re-cut it, re-edit it, which was what I wanted to do. It would have been ten times as good".

The Final Cut
European distributors of the film StudioCanal began a Facebook campaign in 2013 to find missing material, which culminated in the discovery of a 92-minute 35 mm print at the Harvard Film Archive. This print had previously been known as the "Middle Version" and was itself assembled from a 35 mm print of the original edit Robin Hardy had made in the United Kingdom in 1973, but which was never released. Robin Hardy believes that the original edit will probably never be found, saying, "Sadly, it seems as though this has been lost forever. However, I am delighted that a 1979 Abraxas print has been found as I also put together this cut myself, and it crucially restores the story order to that which I had originally intended."

Hardy reported in July 2013 that Studiocanal intended to restore and release the most complete version possible of the film. Rialto Pictures announced that they were to release the new digital restoration in North American cinemas on 27 September 2013. This new version was also released on DVD on 13 October 2013. It is 91 minutes long, shorter than the director's cut but longer than the theatrical cut, and is known as The Wicker Man: The Final Cut.

The Final Cut (UK) Blu-ray (2013) features short documentaries "Burnt Offering: The Cult of the Wicker Man", "Worshipping the Wicker Man", "The Music of the Wicker Man", interviews with director Robin Hardy and actor Christopher Lee, a restoration comparison, and the theatrical trailer. The second disc features both the UK 87-minute theatrical cut and the 95-minute 2013 director's cut, along with an audio commentary on the director's cut and a making-of for the commentary. The third disc is the soundtrack to the film.

Reception
David McGillivray of The Monthly Film Bulletin praised the film as "an immensely enjoyable piece of hokum, thoroughly well researched, performed and directed." Variety wrote that Anthony Shaffer's screenplay "for sheer imagination and near-terror, has seldom been equalled." Kevin Thomas of the Los Angeles Times called it "a witty work of the macabre" with "the splendid performances typical of British films." Janet Maslin of The New York Times was more negative, calling it "handsomely photographed" with "good performances," but "something of a howl" even though "it seems to have been made in all seriousness."

The Wicker Man initially had moderate success and won the Golden Licorn for Best Film at the 1974 Paris International Festival of Fantastic and Science-Fiction Film, but largely slipped into obscurity. In 1977 the American film magazine Cinefantastique devoted a commemorative issue to the film, asserting that the film is "the Citizen Kane of horror movies" – an oft-quoted phrase attributed to this issue.

Decades after its release, the film still receives positive reviews from critics and is considered one of the best films of 1973. At the film review aggregator Rotten Tomatoes, The Wicker Man holds an 88% "Fresh" rating based on 57 reviews, with a weighted average score of 7.7/10 and the site's consensus: "This intelligent horror film is subtle in its thrills and chills, with an ending that is both shocking and truly memorable". In 2008, The Wicker Man was ranked by Empire at No. 485 of The 500 Greatest Movies of All Time. Christopher Lee considered The Wicker Man his best film. Similarly, Edward Woodward said that The Wicker Man was one of his favourite films and that the character of Howie was the best part he ever played. In addition to Lee's admiration of the final shot of the film (of the collapsing Wicker man), Woodward said that it is the best final shot of any film ever made. In 2010 The Guardian newspaper ranked it as No 4 in its "25 best horror films of all time" listings.

In his 2010 BBC documentary series A History of Horror, writer and actor Mark Gatiss referred to the film as a prime example of a short-lived subgenre he called "folk horror", grouping it with 1968's Witchfinder General and 1971's The Blood on Satan's Claw. In 2003, the Crichton Campus of the University of Glasgow in Dumfries, Dumfries and Galloway hosted a three-day conference on The Wicker Man. The conference led to two collections of articles about the film. In 2004, The Wicker Man ranked No, 45 on Bravo's 100 Scariest Movie Moments.

Accolades

Popular culture
The film brought the wicker man into modern popular culture. In recent times, a wicker man has been burnt at festivals such as Burning Man in the United States, and the former Wickerman Festival in Scotland.

In 1998, Swedish black metal band Marduk (band) used a line from this film on the introduction to the track "Slay The Nazarene" from the Nightwing (album).

In 2000, British heavy metal band Iron Maiden released a single called "The Wicker Man" in tribute to the film. In 2016, British band Radiohead released the music video for the song "Burn the Witch", made in stop-motion animation and whose storyline greatly resembles that of The Wicker Man.

In 2018, a rollercoaster inspired by the film opened at Alton Towers, England. Wicker Man is a wooden roller-coaster that features a six-storey wicker man structure which the train passes through three times as it bursts into flames.

Ewan McGregor is watching the final scene in the movie Shallow Grave, representing the building sense of doom he's feeling within that story.

The creators of The League of Gentlemen television series often reference the film in their work, particularly in the Inside No. 9 episode 'Mr. King'.

Related works

Novelisation 
A novelisation, which expands on the story and bears the same title, was released in 1978. It was written by Hardy and Shaffer.

Possible sequel
In 1989, Shaffer wrote a thirty-page film script treatment entitled The Loathsome Lambton Worm, a direct sequel to The Wicker Man, for producer Lance Reynolds. It would have been more fantastical in subject matter than the original film, and relied more heavily on special effects. In this continuation of the story, which begins immediately after the ending of the first film, Sergeant Neil Howie is rescued from the burning Wicker Man by a group of police officers from the mainland. Howie sets out to bring Lord Summerisle and his pagan followers to justice, but becomes embroiled in a series of challenges which pit the old gods against his own Christian faith. The script culminates in a climactic battle between Howie and a fire-breathing dragon – the titular Lambton Worm – and ends with a suicidal Howie plunging to his death from a cliff while tied to two large eagles. Shaffer's sequel was never produced, but his treatment, complete with illustrations, was eventually published in the companion book Inside The Wicker Man.

Hardy was not asked to direct the sequel, and never read the script, as he did not like the idea of Howie surviving the sacrifice, or the fact that the actors would have aged by twenty to thirty years between the two films. In May 2010, Hardy discussed The Loathsome Lambton Worm. "I know Tony did write that, but I don't think anyone particularly liked it, or it would have been made."

A fan-made full-cast audio drama adaptation of Shaffer's The Loathsome Lambton Worm treatment was eventually released in 2020.

Remake
An American remake of the same name, starring Nicolas Cage and Ellen Burstyn, and directed by Neil LaBute was released in 2006. Hardy expressed concern about the remake.

Stage production
A stage adaptation was announced for the 2009 Edinburgh Festival Fringe, and was directed by Andrew Steggall. The production was based jointly upon Anthony Shaffer's original The Wicker Man script and David Pinner's novel Ritual. Robin Hardy gave input on the project, and original songs and music from the film were supervised by Gary Carpenter, the original music director. Workshop rehearsals were held at The Drill Hall in London in March 2008, and a casting call was held in Glasgow in May 2009. After three weeks at the Pleasance in Edinburgh in August 2009, the production was to visit the Perth Rep, the Eden Court Theatre in Inverness, and then have a short run at Citizen's Theatre in Glasgow, with hopes for a run in London in 2010. However, in July 2009 it was announced that the production had been cancelled, three weeks before it had been due to preview.

In 2011, the National Theatre of Scotland produced An Appointment with the Wicker Man written by Greg Hemphill and Donald McCleary. The production has an amateur theatre company attempting to stage a Wicker Man musical.

Spiritual sequel
In 2011, a spiritual successor entitled The Wicker Tree was released. It was directed by Hardy and featured an appearance by Lee. Hardy first published the story as a novel, under the name Cowboys for Christ. First announced in April 2000, filming on the project began on 19 July 2009 according to IMDb. It follows two young American Christian evangelists who travel to Scotland; like Woodward's character in The Wicker Man, the two Americans are virgins who encounter a pagan laird and his followers. The film received mixed reviews.

Those involved in the production of the film have given conflicting statements regarding the identity of Christopher Lee's character, referred to only as Old Gentleman in the credits. Writer–director Robin Hardy has stated that the ambiguity was intentional. Fans would immediately recognise Lee's character as Lord Summerisle. Lee himself has contradicted this, stating that the two are not meant to be the same character, and that The Wicker Tree is not a sequel in any way.

Potential graphic novel and third film
As a former artist, Hardy expressed great interest in the medium of comics, and planned a comic book which would retell the story of The Wicker Man, based on his own storyboards for the film. Hardy was in talks with yet unnamed artists to work on the project, as he found it too difficult to make the characters look consistent from one panel to the next. Hardy was working on his next film, The Wrath of the Gods, at the time of his death on 1 July 2016. He intended the graphic novel and the new film to be released at the same time in autumn 2013; however as of autumn 2014 neither had been released, and the film never started production.

See also 
 Celtic mythology
 Hebridean mythology and folklore
 List of incomplete or partially lost films
 BFI Top 100 British films

References

Bibliography

External links

 
 
 

1973 films
1973 horror films
1970s mystery films
1970s English-language films
1970s British films
British horror films
British Lion Films films
British mystery films
Celtic mythology in popular culture
Films about cults
Films about human sacrifice
Films about murder
Films about neopaganism
Films about virginity
Films based on British novels
Films based on horror novels
Films based on thriller novels
Films set in Scotland
Films set on fictional islands
Films shot in Scotland
Paganism in Europe
Folk horror films
Police detective films
Religious horror films
Films with screenplays by Anthony Shaffer
1970s police procedural films
British police films
1973 directorial debut films
British exploitation films